Barry Geel (born 30 April 1982) is a South African rugby union footballer.   He regularly plays as a centre.

Career

He spent another four years with the Peacock Blues, making 76 appearances and scoring 23 tries.

References

Living people
1982 births
South African rugby union players
Cheetahs (rugby union) players
Free State Cheetahs players
Griquas (rugby union) players
Leopards (rugby union) players
Rugby union centres
Afrikaner people
People from Springs, Gauteng
Rugby union players from Gauteng